In music, a tape phase is a recorded composition using a tape loop or its electronic simulation to produce and vary sounds. It is a form of tape music.

Tape phase compositions generally make little use of tonality owing to the difficulty of producing and maintaining a coherent pitch. They may have a strong pulse and rhythm, as in the work of Steve Reich, or may be free form in this regard, as in the work of Jimi Hendrix.

Techniques

 Flanging.

Exponents

 Terry Riley.
 Steve Reich.
 Karlheinz Stockhausen.
 Jimi Hendrix.
 The Beatles.

Pieces

 It's Gonna Rain (Reich, 1965).
 Come Out (Reich) (Reich, 1966).
 ...And the Gods Made Love (Hendrix, 1968).
 Moon, Turn the Tides...Gently Gently Away (Hendrix, 1968).
 Revolution 9 (The Beatles, 1969).

See also

 Sound collage.
 Noise music.
 Experimental music.
 Process music.
 Noise in music.

Electronic music